The Pitmegea River is a  stream in the western North Slope Borough of the U.S. state of Alaska.

See also
List of rivers of Alaska

References

Rivers of Alaska
Drainage basins of the Chukchi Sea
Rivers of North Slope Borough, Alaska